This is a list of supermarket chains in Israel.

List

See also
Economy of Israel
List of companies of Israel

References

Israel

Supermarket chains